Andrew Hung is a British musician, songwriter and producer based in London, UK. He is one of the founding members of electronic drone band Fuck Buttons. He is currently signed to London based record label Lex Records.

Life and career 

In 2012 Hung founded a new band called Dawn Hunger with vocalist Claire Inglis and musician Matthew de Pulford. He also released his solo debut EP called Rave Cave in 2015. Hung also works as a producer. In 2016 he co-wrote and co-produced Beth Orton's album Kidsticks. Hung also composed the soundtracks for the films The Greasy Strangler and An Evening with Beverly Luff Linn. Hung released his first solo debut LP, Realisationship, on 6 October 2017.

Discography

Studio albums 
 Realisationship (6 October 2017, Lex)
 Devastations (18 June 2021, Lex)

Extended plays 
 Rave Cave 1 (12 November 2015, self-released)
 Rave Cave 2 (15 December 2015, self-released)

Soundtracks 
 The Greasy Strangler (5 October 2016, Death Waltz)
 An Evening with Beverly Luff Linn (19 October 2018, Lex)

References 

1982 births
Living people
English electronic musicians
21st-century British male musicians
British people of Chinese descent